Sylvi Cecilia Siltanen (née Johansson; 22 November 1909, Ruotsinpyhtää – 8 December 1986, Turku) was a Finnish accountant and politician. She was a member of the Parliament of Finland from 1958 to 1972, representing the Social Democratic Party of Finland (SDP). She served as the Governor of Turku and Pori Province from 1972 to 1977.

References

1909 births
1986 deaths
People from Ruotsinpyhtää
People from Uusimaa Province (Grand Duchy of Finland)
Social Democratic Party of Finland politicians
Members of the Parliament of Finland (1958–62)
Members of the Parliament of Finland (1962–66)
Members of the Parliament of Finland (1966–70)
Members of the Parliament of Finland (1970–72)
20th-century Finnish women politicians
Women members of the Parliament of Finland